Craig McManus is an American television soap opera director and stage manager.

Positions held
General Hospital
 Occasional Director (1996–present)
 Stage Manager (1996–present)

Awards and nominations
Daytime Emmy Award
Win, 2000, 2004-2006, Directing Team, General Hospital
Nomination, 1996-1999, 2001, Directing Team, General Hospital

Directors Guild of America Award
Win, 2006, Directing Team, General Hospital (episode #10,914)
Win, 2003, Directing Team, Port Charles (episode #1433)
Win, 2002, Directing Team, General Hospital (episode #9801)
Win, 1998, Directing Team, General Hospital (episode #8883)
Win, 1996, Directing Team, General Hospital (episode #8248)

External links

ABC: GH

American television directors
Living people
Year of birth missing (living people)